Shui Pin is one of the 39 constituencies in the Yuen Long District of Hong Kong.

The constituency returns one district councillor to the Yuen Long District Council, with an election every four years. Shui Pin constituency is loosely based on Covent Garden, Emerald Green, Greenery Place, Park Royale, Parkside Villa, Scenic Gardens, Shui Pin Wai Estate, Springdale Villas and Villa Art Deco in Yuen Long with an estimated population of 18,727.

Councillors represented

Election results

2010s

References

Yuen Long
Constituencies of Hong Kong
Constituencies of Yuen Long District Council
1994 establishments in Hong Kong
Constituencies established in 1994